The Forest Stewardship Council GmbH (FSC) is an international non-profit, multistakeholder organization established in 1993 that promotes responsible management of the world's forests via timber certification. This organization uses a market-based approach to transnational environmental policy.

Purpose 

The FSC's stated mission is to "promote environmentally appropriate, socially beneficial, and economically viable management of the world's forests". To this end, the body has published a global strategy with five goals:
 Advancing globally responsible forest management.
 Ensure equitable access to the benefits of FSC systems.
 Ensure integrity, credibility and transparency of the FSC system.
 Create business value for products from FSC certified forests.
 Strengthen the global network to deliver on goals 1 through 4.

These goals are promoted, managed, and developed through six program areas: forests, chain of custody, social policy, monitoring and evaluation, quality assurance, and ecosystem services.

It claims that forests managed to its standards offer benefits to both local and wider communities and these are said to include cleaner air and water, and a contribution to mitigating the effects of climate change.

Directly or indirectly, FSC addresses issues such as illegal logging, deforestation and global warming and some reports indicate positive effects on economic development, environmental conservation, poverty alleviation, and social and political empowerment.

Using the FSC logo supposedly signifies that the product comes from responsible sources—environmentally appropriate, socially beneficial and economically viable. The FSC label is used on a wide range of timber and non-timber products, from paper and furniture to medicine and jewelry, and aims to give consumers the option of supporting responsible forestry.

History 

According to the Food and Agriculture Organization of the United Nations, half of the world's forests have already been altered, degraded, destroyed or converted into other land uses. Much of the remaining forests today suffer from illegal exploitation and otherwise poor management. FSC was established as a response to these concerns over global deforestation.

Tropical deforestation as a global concern rose to prominence in the 1980s and can be somewhat attributed to a fight for action by environmentalists and northern countries over the need to protect tropical woodland. Prior to this, a number of other economic and regulatory mechanisms such as financial aid, policy frameworks and trade conventions were established in the fight against deforestation. These include the International Tropical Timber Agreement (1983), the Convention of International Trade on Endangered Species (1975) and the Global Environment Facility (1991). Despite the increased level of concern on the run-up to the 1992 Earth Summit held in Rio de Janeiro, tensions between the North and the global South over access to finance and technology for the preservation of forests protracted negotiations. Although many Northern countries had hoped for a legally binding convention the resulting Statement of Forest Principles represents the "mean position of the lowest common denominator" and is voluntary. Disappointed with the outcome of the Earth Summit, NGOs such as the World Wide Fund for Nature (WWF) began to turn their attention to industry for a more meaningful governance-orientated resolution to the problem of deforestation.

In the lead up to the Earth Summit, social groups, NGOs and industries were also beginning to consult on the issue of deforestation. In America the consultation process that eventually led to the establishment of the FSC was initiated in 1990 and concluded in the confirmation of support for the development of a voluntary worldwide certification and accreditation governance system that would cover all forest types. In the UK, NGO WWF began to facilitate action through the establishment of the 1995 Group, recruiting organisations that had been spurred on by instances of direct action and boycotting over the sale of tropical wood to form an NGO-business partnership. Through stakeholder involvement it became apparent that a standard-setting body would be required to verify the source of wood products and define sustainable forest management. After 18 months of consultation in ten different countries, the Forest Stewardship Council was established in 1993.

The failure of governments to reach any notable form of consensus in the form of an internationally reaching and legally binding agreement caused both disillusionment and an opportunity for change through the involvement of civil society and business actors to form "soft law". As such the establishment of the Forest Stewardship Council as the response to this disillusionment also represents a global shift from government to governance and its creation is a primary example of the use of market and economic factors to create movement on a global environmental issue. The evolving historical context in which the FSC was formed is theorized to reflect a much broader skepticism towards state power and as a consequence a shift away from traditional state-centric forms of regulation. That said, although the FSC transcends national boundaries, the state continues to play a part in the regulatory landscape of the domestic forest and as such the FSC must develop appropriate domestic governance to reflect this.

Structure and governance 

FSC is an international membership organization with a governance structure based on participation, democracy, equity and transparency. It is a platform for forest owners, timber industries, social groups and environmental organizations to come together to find solutions to improve forest management practices.  It is an example of a product-oriented multistakeholder governance  group.

It is governed by its members, who join either as individuals or as representatives of organizations; they come from diverse backgrounds including environmental NGOs, the timber trade, community forest groups and forest certification organizations. Members apply to join one of three chambers – environmental, social and economic; each chamber is divided into northern and southern sub-chambers and votes are weighted to ensure that north and south each have 50%; this system is designed to ensure that influence is shared equally between different interest groups, without having to limit the number of members.

FSC has three levels of decision making bodies: The General Assembly, the Board of Directors and the Executive Director.

The General Assembly, which takes place every three years, is made up of the three membership chambers and is the highest decision-making body in FSC. The most recent General Assembly took place in 2014. Every member has the right to attend, formulate and submit motions, and vote. The General Assembly represents an opportunity for everybody to share, learn, establish new alliances and exchange and explore business opportunities to create a better future of the forests.
The FSC Board of Directors is accountable to the FSC members. It is made up of nine elected individuals who are FSC members and advocates. One member of the Board of Directors is elected from each sub-chamber of the General Assembly.
The Executive Director runs FSC on a day-to-day basis with the support of a multi-cultural professional team at the FSC International Center. He or she is accountable to the FSC Board of Directors.

While the FSC International Center is based in Bonn, Germany, it has a decentralized network of FSC Network Partners that promote responsible forest management on behalf of FSC. FSC Network Partners include FSC National Offices, FSC National Representatives and FSC National Focal Points.

Kim Carstensen has been the Director General of the Forest Stewardship Council (FSC) since October 2012. Mr. Carstensen is a recognized global leader.

Standards, certification and accreditation

Standards development 

FSC is a global forest certification system established for forests and forest products; from the perspective of the WWF this voluntary mechanism can be regarded as one of the more interesting initiatives of the last decade to promote better forest management. while a number of alternative national and regional forest certification bodies also exist around the globe
It has 10 Principles and associated Criteria (FSC P&C) that form the basis for all FSC forest management standards and certification. FSC International sets the framework for developing and maintaining international, national and sub-national standards. This is intended to ensure that the process for developing FSC policies and standards is transparent, independent and participatory.

In February 2012 the membership approved the first major revision to the FSC P&C, in order to bring its certification up to date. The review and revision of the FSC P&C began in 2008 and gathered feedback from many FSC members and other stakeholders.
This revision also marked the start of a process of developing baseline requirements for each of the revised Criteria; These requirements - called International Generic Indicators (IGIs) - are intended to ensure consistent application of the FSC P&C across all countries. Where national standards are not currently established, the IGIs will be used as interim standards.

National Forest Stewardship Standard 
In addition to its global certification standard, FSC develops national standards in selected countries. These standards are closely aligned to the global certification standard and its criteria, but are adapted to local context conditions. Currently, so called National Forest Stewardship Standards exist for the following countries (sorted by first year of introduction):

Forest management certification 
Forest management certification is a voluntary process for verifying responsible forest practices. An FSC-accredited certification body performs a forest inspection at the request of the forest owner or operator. Certificate holders are charged an annual fee to renew their accreditation, and continuous compliance is expected.

The FSC P&C apply to all tropical, temperate and boreal forests and many to plantations and partially replanted forests. Though mainly designed for forest management for timber products, they are also largely relevant for non-timber products (e.g. Brazil nuts) and other environmental services such as clean water and air and carbon sequestration. Prior to the revision process which ended in February 2012, the FSC P&C were the following (not in priority order):

The Revised P&C were approved in February 2012; the basic requirements are:

 The Organization shall comply with all applicable laws, regulations and nationally-ratified international treaties, conventions and agreements.
 The Organization shall maintain or enhance the social and economic wellbeing of workers.
 The Organization shall identify and uphold indigenous peoples’ legal and customary rights of ownership, use and management of land, territories and resources affected by management activities.
 The Organization shall contribute to maintaining or enhancing the social and economic wellbeing of local communities
 The Organization shall efficiently manage the range of multiple products and services of the Management Unit to maintain or enhance long term economic viability and the range of environmental and social benefits.
 The Organization shall maintain, conserve and/or restore ecosystem services and environmental values of the Management Unit, and shall avoid, repair or mitigate negative environmental impacts.
 The Organization shall have a management plan consistent with its policies and objectives and proportionate to scale, intensity and risks of its management activities. The management plan shall be implemented and kept up to date based on monitoring information in order to promote adaptive management. The associated planning and procedural documentation shall be sufficient to guide staff, inform affected stakeholders and interested stakeholders and to justify management decisions.
 The Organization shall demonstrate that, progress towards achieving the management objectives, the impacts of management activities and the condition of the Management Unit, are monitored and evaluated proportionate to the scale, intensity and risk of management activities, in order to implement adaptive management.
 The Organization shall maintain and/or enhance the High Conservation Values in the Management Unit through applying the precautionary approach.
 Management activities conducted by or for The Organization for the Management Unit shall be selected and implemented consistent with The Organization's economic, environmental and social policies and objectives and in compliance with the Principles and Criteria collectively.

If the accreditation body finds forest management is not fully compliant, pre-conditions are noted which must be fulfilled before the FSC certificate can be awarded. If minor non-compliances are noted, the certificate can be issued with conditions that have to be met within a clearly determined timeframe.

The accreditation body audit each FSC certificate at least once a year. Non-compliance results in a request to make the prescribed changes within a given timeframe or lose its FSC certificate. Depending on the seriousness of the infringement, the timeline can go from one year for minor administrative infringements to immediate action for major infringements.

Chain of Custody certification 

The FSC Chain of Custody (CoC) system allows the tracking of FSC certified material from the forest to the consumer. It is a method by which companies can show their commitment to the environment and responsible forest management. Only companies that have FSC chain of custody certification are allowed to use the FSC trademarks and labels to promote their products. The FSC label therefore provides a link between responsible production and responsible consumption and helps the consumer to make socially and environmentally responsible buying decisions.

Once a forest is certified it is important to be able to trace the products that come from it throughout the supply chain to ensure that any claims on the origin of the product are credible and verifiable. FSC chain of custody certification is a voluntary process. It is a tracking system that allows manufacturers and traders to demonstrate that timber comes from a forest that is responsibly managed in accordance with the FSC P&C. It tracks the flow of certified wood through the supply chain and across borders through each successive stage - including processing, transformation and manufacturing - all the way to the final product. It is up to a company to initiate the certification process by requesting the services of an accredited certification body to inspect its internal tracking procedures. Companies committing to FSC include home-improvement or DIY companies, publishers and retailers, amongst many others.

All operations that want to produce an FSC certified product or want to make corresponding sales claims must comply with FSC's international standards for chain of custody. An operation must specify the range of products they wish to sell as FSC certified and promote with the FSC trademark. The certification body inspects the operation to ensure that controls are in place to identify eligible sources for the specified product range and to prevent certified and recycled material from mixing with material from unacceptable sources. If an operation complies with FSC standards, the company is issued an FSC chain of custody certificate. Major failure to comply with the standard will normally disqualify the candidate from certification or lead to de-certification.

Controlled wood certification 

The FSC Mix label was introduced in 2004. It allows manufacturers to mix FSC-certified material with uncertified materials in FSC-labeled products under controlled conditions. It aims to avoid the use of wood products from "unacceptable" sources in FSC-labeled products. Unacceptable sources include illegally harvested wood, wood harvested in violation of traditional and civil rights, wood harvested in HCV forests and wood harvested from areas where genetically modified trees are planted.

Accreditation

To maintain independence between the standards it sets and the operations seeking certification of both kinds, FSC does not conduct certification audits itself. FSC has developed rigorous procedures and standards to evaluate whether organizations of certifiers (certification bodies) can provide independent and competent evaluation (certification) services. This process is known as ‘accreditation’.

A potential certification body must gain FSC accreditation to be able to evaluate, monitor and certify companies to FSC standards. To become FSC accredited, certifiers have to comply with an extensive set of rules and procedures which are verified by ASI -  Assurance Services International GmbH - an international assurance partner for leading voluntary sustainability standards and initiatives such as MSC and RSPO. This includes an office audit and the witnessing of one or more audits in the field. ASI monitors accredited certification bodies to ensure the appropriateness of their operations can be continuously guaranteed.

To control the continued implementation of FSC rules and procedures, every year ASI conducts at least one office and one field assessment for each FSC accredited certification body. The exact number and distribution of ASI assessments takes a number of complex factors into account (geographic areas, policies or products that carry increased risk) and the number of FSC certificates handled by an accredited certification body, and is meant to ensure that the certification services delivered by the certifier meet the requirements of the FSC.

Some summaries of ASI surveillance audits are publicly available on the ASI website. If an FSC accredited certification body is found to not fully comply with FSC rules and procedures, nonconformities (NCs) are raised (see above).

Facts and figures 

In September 2012, some 165 million hectares were certified to FSC's Principles and Criteria in 80 countries. Around 24,000 FSC Chain of Custody certificates were active in 107 countries. The FSC website has statistics on regional distributions, ownership and forest type and numbers of FSC certificates representing all valid forest management and chain of custody certificates.

Costs 

The expenses for successful forest management certification typically are divided into:

 Costs for an enhancement of sustainability;
 Costs for audits (these are controlled by third parties); and
 Secondary costs (e.g. losses of stumpage revenues).

FSC Friday 
FSC Friday is a once-a-year event dedicated to the celebration of forests around the globe and the promotion of responsible forest management worldwide. The first international FSC Friday took place in Bonn on 25 September 2009. On FSC Friday, people are invited to investigate what's in their shopping basket, and look for the FSC logo. Events related to FSC Friday take place around the world with companies and supporters promoting the FSC logo and what it stands for. FSC Friday in 2010 took place on 24 September and the following week. Events took place at FSC certified forests, schools, universities and community centers around the world, including the United Kingdom, Austria, South Africa, Germany, Brazil, Argentina, Belgium, Netherlands, Denmark, France, India, Wales, Switzerland and Singapore.

In 2022, FSC Friday will take place on 30 September 2022.

Members and partners 
FSC has around 850 members, including: 
 several international NGOs such as the World Wide Fund for Nature, and Oxfam/NOVIB;
 smaller, national NGOs, often with a conservation or environmental focus, such as the US Wildlife Conservation Society, the Spanish Ornithological Society and Cameroon Environmental Watch;
 civil society organizations with a community development focus, such as the Foundation for People and Community Development (Papua New Guinea) and the Mountain Association for Community Development (USA);
 forestry-focused research organizations, such as the Forestry Science and Research Institute (Brazil);
 certification organizations, such as KPMG Forest Certification Solutions (Canada), Forest Eco Certification (India), Wood Certification Ltd (India);
 private companies in the forestry, timber and paper industries, such as Mondi (South Africa) Sun Wood Industries (Thailand) and IKEA (Sweden);
 trade unions and workers’ associations, such as the Latvian Wood Branch Trade Union and the Swedish Forest and Wood Trade Union.
 
Numerous governments worldwide have strengthened market-based incentives for timber certification by providing tax benefits to certified companies, referencing certified products as requirements in their procurement policies and supporting projects linked to FSC through their international development agencies. Some companies also choose timber certification as a tool to demonstrate their commitment to sustainability. Such activities demonstrate broad support for FSC certification as good practice.

FSC is a member of the International Social and Environmental Accreditation and Labelling (ISEAL) Alliance, an association of voluntary international standard setting and certification organizations focused on social and environmental issues. Since 2006, FSC has complied with ISEAL's Code of Good Practice for Setting Social and Environmental standards, aimed at assuring high standards for credible behavior in ethical trade.

In 2009, FSC began a pilot project with Fairtrade International (FLO) to help community-based and small-scale timber producers get a fair price for their products and gain visibility in the marketplace. The first jointly labelled FSC-FLO products went onto the market in 2011, using wood from the forests of the Curacautín Valley in Chile, manufactured commercially by Swedish firm Kährs.

FSC also works in liaison with the International Organization for Standardization (ISO). It contributes to the ISO's committees on sustainable criteria for bioenergy, environmental auditing and environmental labelling.

Criticism 

Since it was founded, FSC has been criticized for a range of different reasons.

In the 2000s and 2010s, a number of well-known NGOs and environmental organizations have canceled their support for FSC. These include FERN (2011), Friends of the Earth UK (2008), ROBINWOOD (2009), the Swedish Society for Nature Conservation (SSNC) (2011), and smaller groups such as Rainforest Rescue and the Association for the Ecological Defence of Galicia (ADEGA).

Other NGO members, instead of withdrawing support, have critically evaluated FSC's performance and made recommendations to improve the credibility of the organization. These include Greenpeace International, whose 2008 report "Holding the line with FSC" focused on controversial certificates and ways forward. A revised version of the report was released in 2011, which concluded that some progress had been made. But it also identified ongoing weaknesses, including lack of guidance on HCVFs and activities in controversial areas like the Congo Basin and problems with the Controlled Wood label, the Chain of Custody system and logo integrity.  The report concluded with 10 immediate changes needed to "restore FSC’s credibility". To improve its process for tracking FSC certified products and maintaining the veracity of FSC claims, FSC is currently developing an Online Claims Platform and is pursuing opportunities for fiber testing. Chamber-balanced Working Groups have been established to strengthen the Controlled Wood system and the Chain of Custody standard, and options are being pursued to address the performance of certification bodies.

FSC has been harshly criticized by Simon Counsel, one of its founding members, now the director of the Rainforest Foundation. In 2008, he described the FSC as the "Enron of Forestry". He cited case studies from six countries which suggested that in these cases FSC was not properly controlling accredited auditors or certifiers. The FSC reviewed the certificates in question, and showed that some of the initial investigations were justified. This resulted in the removal of the license to certify from the Thai company, Forest Industry Organization.

FSC-Watch is a website critical of FSC which is run by a group of people, including Simon Counsel, who are concerned about what they perceive as the constant and serious erosion of the FSC's reliability and credibility. Its website offers a wide range of extensive and detailed criticisms of FSC. FSC-Watch commonly accuses FSC of practices that are a form of greenwashing.

The "mixed" label(meaning a mix of FSC-certified, recycled, and "controlled"(a lower tier) ) is often misinterpreted as a mix of FSC-certified and recycled materials or multiple FSC-certified forests.

In 2008, the EcoEarth/Rainforest Portal, an Internet ecological news aggregation service, publicly questioned the FSC-endorsed policy of old-growth forest logging. They asserted that research does not support the idea that this type of logging is carbon positive or sustainable, though these views are disputed.

Critics are encouraged to file complaints and disputes against FSC in case of any differences. But complainants must meet a number of conditions to be able to file complaints and it is disputed whether the FSC takes effective action even in the case of some formal complaints. Recently, FSC has implemented a series of actions to strengthen its stakeholder engagement process, including the establishment of a Quality Assurance Unit within FSC, time-bound dispute resolution procedures and a web-based portal for tracking disputes.

In 2018, Greenpeace International chose not to renew its membership with FSC, claiming that FSC is not meeting its goals of protecting forests and human rights. The same year FSC investigated allegations
made by local tribesmen in Papua against FSC certificate holder Korindo Group. The investigation found Korindo to have violated the rights of the Papuan indigenous peoples and benefited from close ties with the Indonesian military for its own economic benefit. While the report recommended stripping Korindo of it FSC certificate, FSC chose not to publicly release the report and continued its collaboration with Korindo.

In August 2021, FSC announced its decision of disassociation from the Korindo Group which came into effect on 16 October 2021.

Preference for bigger companies 
Some critics point out that FSC certification has a linked set of weaknesses: that it is not suited for small businesses, that it is anti-competitive and that therefore in a wider view it is counter-ecological:

 Only large businesses with rigid structures can afford the process of assessment and maintenance of the schemes.
 Certification schemes are anti-competitive because they favor larger firms over smaller ones.
 This bias towards large companies is counter-ecological as it promotes a model of a few massive suppliers.

Fewer local companies mean that goods have to travel farther, and the resources and skills of local communities degrade.

Partly in response to these criticisms, to make certification more accessible to small and medium-sized businesses, FSC instituted the Small and Low Intensity Managed Forests (SLIMF) initiative and group certification. SLIMF adapts the FSC system to the realities and needs of small and low intensity forest operations by offering special streamlined procedures, with less rigorous requirements for a number of its forest management criteria. SLIMF are defined as forests of 100 hectares or less. Group certification allows a group of forest owners to share certification costs. A documented success of group certification in a developing country involved smallholder farmers growing acacia in Vietnam. In that case, farmers were able to sell group certified wood at a premium versus comparable non-certified wood. In October 2012, worldwide, 8.7% of FSC certificates were held by community-owned forests. SLIMF and group certification are intended to allow FSC to promote responsible forest management in small-scale forests as well as large ones.

Resolute Forest Products 
The world's largest manager of FSC certified forests, Resolute Forest Products, has been accused of illegal logging on Barriere Lake Algonquin territory and of violating indigenous rights. In July 2012, members of the Algonquin community in southern Quebec staged a camp to observe and deter the logging of their unceded territory.

The firm has a different view of related events, stating that their "right to harvest in the area [had] been approved by the QMNRW, following appropriate consultation with the Barrière Lake Algonquin band council."

FSC as market-driven environmental governance 

Because it works outside of state regulations, some academics have classified FSC as an example of a non-state market driven (NSMD) form of environmental governance. This means that it uses the market to drive the sustainable management of forests. As Cashore (2002) observes the FSC network does not have the political authority of a traditional nation state and no one can be fined or imprisoned for failing to comply with its regulations. In addition, governments are forbidden from being members of the FSC and their only engagement with FSC is as land owners. The authority of the FSC is determined by the approval of external audiences, such as environmental NGOs.

The FSC Label is an example of the use of public purchasing power to create shifts in industry and regulate the negative environmental impacts of deforestation. The FSC Label "works" by providing an incentive for responsible forestry in the market place. It offers manufacturers a competitive advantage and thereby increases market access to new markets and maintains access to existing ones.

Non-state market-driven methods are often used because of allegations of ‘state failure’ in managing the environment. In the neoliberal view, market based methods are seen as one of the most effective and efficient ways to meet environmental goals. The market is seen as the key mechanism for producing the maximum social good and governance networks are seen as the most efficient way to regulate environmental concerns.

The FSC transnational NGO network demonstrates theories of global governance, more specifically in governance network theory. FSC is an example of how network governance can create change in industry and encourage organizations to improve the sustainability of industrial forestry practices. As Bäckstrand (2008) states, the FSC governance network brings together private companies, organizations and civil society in a non-hierarchical fashion, to voluntarily address certain goals.  According to governance network theory, actors in the network are dependent on each other and collaborate to reach specific goals, through exchanging information or resources.

Through the chamber system, governance of FSC has checks at local, national and international levels which mean that it includes interests regardless of their geographical location. This gives FSC some advantages over state governance systems. In theory, as a governance network, FSC members share knowledge, environmental goals and knowledge of what those goals entail. This means that they coordinate effectively, improving the process and outcomes of the environmental policies they pursue. Moreover, knowledge sharing and collaboration enables the FSC network to deal with complex and interrelated issues.

Some critiques however suggest that network governance does not always work this way. Network governance theory suggests that partnerships should be equal, but inequalities of power within networks can result in hierarchical relationships determined by more dominant actors. Within FSC, larger international actors may have a stronger influence than smaller stakeholders, meaning that the FSC governance network may not represent all participants fairly. FSC has instituted the chamber system to try to tackle this imbalance.

Furthermore, actors in networks operate as representatives of certain groups but also as individuals with their own agendas and values, and members in the FSC network are usually motivated by pragmatic rather than moral considerations. Moreover, Sorenson and Torfing (2005) argue that for governance networks to achieve their goals they should be controlled by democratically elected politicians. Although formerly there were no elections in the FSC governance system, reforms mean that the Board of Directors is now democratically elected by the membership chambers.

Recognition in green building certification systems 

FSC certified construction wood and construction products made from FSC certified wood can contribute to green building certification systems. Some green building certification systems are recognizing a FSC certification in general, other award different scores to products with FSC 100, FSC MIX or FSC RECYCLED.

LEED 
FSC certified wood products contribute to score up to 2 points in the LEED v4.1 credit 'Sourcing of Raw Materials'. In addition, FSC certified wood products can contribute to score up to 1 point in the LEED v4.1 pilot credit 'Social Equity within the Supply Chain'.

BREEAM 
BREEAM awards credits for FSC certified wood products in the Mat 03 credit. The BREEAM Guidance Note GN18 attributes different scores to FSC 100% (7 points) and FSC MIX / FSC RECYCLED (5 points).

DGNB 
DGNB recognizes FSC certified wood products in the ENV1.3 credit. FSC Mix scores in the Quality Level 1.2 (up to 25 out of 100 points) and FSC 100 / FSC RECYCLED score in the Quality Level 1.3 (up to 70 out of 100 points. FSC RECYCLED also scores points in the Quality Level 2.2.

Competing certification schemes 

There are a number of certification schemes for forest management apart from FSC certification.

The main competing forest certification system is the Programme for the Endorsement of Forest Certification (PEFC), established by a number of stakeholders, including associations of the forest industry, pulp-and-paper production and forest owners in response to the creation and increasing popularity of FSC. PEFC has been criticized for having little influence from local people or environmental organizations, lack of transparency and non-objective requirements.

Other certification schemes include the Sustainable Forestry Initiative (SFI), the Malaysian Timber Certification Council, the Australian Forestry Standard, and Keurhout.

See also
Certified wood
Eco-labels
Aquaculture Stewardship Council
Marine Stewardship Council
Sustainability standards and certification
Independent forest monitoring
Wood laundering

References

External links

Assessments and supporters
Footprints in the Forests: A FERN's assessment of 8 forest certification schemes (2004)
Experiences with voluntary standards initiatives and related multi-stakeholder dialogues. B. Lang. GTZ (2006)
Norwegian Consumer Ombudsman (a Norwegian consumer watchdog group)

Non-profit organisations based in North Rhine-Westphalia
International environmental organizations
International forestry organizations
Nature conservation organisations based in Europe
Forest certification
Timber industry
Forest conservation organizations
Environmental certification marks
Organisations based in Bonn
1993 establishments in Germany
Environmental organisations based in Germany